William George Jacks (born 21 November 1998) is an English cricketer. He is a right-handed batsman and off spin bowler. He made his Test debut against Pakistan in December 2022.

Career
He made his List A debut on 18 May 2018 for Surrey against Somerset in the 2018 Royal London One-Day Cup. In his third game, in the same competition, he scored a match-winning 121 against Gloucestershire. Prior to his List A debut, he was in the England squad for the 2018 Under-19 Cricket World Cup, where he played all six games, including the last as captain.

He made his first-class debut on 20 June 2018, for Surrey in the 2018 County Championship. He made his Twenty20 debut for Surrey in the 2018 t20 Blast on 5 July 2018. In a pre-season T10 match against Lancashire, Jacks scored a century in 25 balls, believed to be the fastest hundred in a match between two professional teams in a true cricket ground.  His century also included six sixes in one over.

On 29 May 2020, Jacks was named in a 55-man group of players to begin training ahead of international fixtures starting in England following the COVID-19 pandemic.

In June 2021, Jacks scored English cricket's third fastest Twenty20 fifty, off 15 balls, as Surrey beat local rivals Middlesex.

In July 2021, Jacks was named in England's One Day International (ODI) squad for their series against Pakistan, after the original squad for the tour was forced to withdraw following positive tests for COVID-19.

In April 2022, he was bought by the Oval Invincibles for the 2022 season of The Hundred. In August 2022, he scored the highest score in the history of The Hundred, at 108 runs in 48 balls. In September 2022, he was named in the England's Test and T20I squad for the series against Pakistan. He made his T20I debut on 23 September 2022, against Pakistan. He made his Test debut against Pakistan, in the same series, on 1 December 2022. 

On 25 February 2023, he named in both England's ODI and T20I squad as injury replacement of Tom Abell, for the series against Bangladesh. He made his ODI debut against Bangladesh, on 1 March 2023.

References

External links
 

1998 births
Living people
English cricketers
England Test cricketers
England Twenty20 International cricketers
Surrey cricketers
Sportspeople from Chertsey
Hobart Hurricanes cricketers
Oval Invincibles cricketers
Islamabad United cricketers